Brian Higden was a priest in England during the 16th century.

Higden was educated at Pembroke College, Oxford. He held livings at Buckenham, Rickinghall and  Nettleton. Higden was Archdeacon of York from 1515 to 1516; and Dean of York  from 1516 until his death on 5 June 1539. He is buried in the churchyard at York Minster.

Notes 

1539 deaths
Alumni of Pembroke College, Oxford
Archdeacons of York
Deans of York
17th-century English Anglican priests